E. flavescens may refer to:

 Echeandia flavescens, a herbaceous plant
 Echinocardium flavescens, a heart urchin
 Eicherax flavescens, a robber fly
 Eimeria flavescens, an apicomplexan parasite
 Elachista flavescens, a European moth
 Eleutherodactylus flavescens, a frog endemic to the Dominican Republic
 Elisolimax flavescens, a land snail
 Elleanthus flavescens, a flowering plant
 Empidonax flavescens, a tyrant flycatcher
 Empoasca flavescens, a green leafhopper
 Enneapogon flavescens, an Australian grass
 Eptesicus flavescens, a vesper bat
 Eria flavescens, a flowering plant
 Erebomaster flavescens, a daddy longlegs
 Eublemma flavescens, an owlet moth
 Eucalyptus flavescens, a flowering plant
 Eulaema flavescens, a euglossine bee
 Eumecynostomum flavescens, an acoelomorph worm
 Eurycorypha flavescens, a bush cricket
 Exorista flavescens, a Palearctic fly